Dmitry Berezkin (born 10 February 1963) is a Russian sailor. He competed at the 1992, 1996, 2000, and the 2004 Summer Olympics.

References

External links
 

1963 births
Living people
Russian male sailors (sport)
Olympic sailors of the Unified Team
Olympic sailors of Russia
Sailors at the 1992 Summer Olympics – 470
Sailors at the 1996 Summer Olympics – 470
Sailors at the 2000 Summer Olympics – 470
Sailors at the 2004 Summer Olympics – 470
Sportspeople from Moscow